AT&T Stadium is a retractable-roof stadium in Arlington, Texas, United States. It serves as the home of the Dallas Cowboys of the National Football League (NFL), and was completed on May 27, 2009.  It is also the home of the Cotton Bowl Classic and the Big 12 Championship Game.  The stadium is one of eleven US venues set to host matches during the 2026 FIFA World Cup. The facility, owned by the city of Arlington, can also be used for a variety of other activities, such as concerts, basketball games, soccer, college and high-school football contests, rodeos, motocross, Spartan Races, and professional wrestling. It replaced the partially covered Texas Stadium, which served as the Cowboys' home from 1971 through the 2008 season.

The stadium is widely referred to as Jerry World and The Death Star after Dallas Cowboys owner Jerry Jones, who originally envisioned it as a large entertainment venue. The stadium can seat around 80,000 people, but can be reconfigured to hold around 100,000 seats making it the largest stadium in the NFL by seating capacity. Additional attendance is made possible by the Party Pass (open areas) sections behind the seats in each end zone which are positioned on a series of six elevated platforms connected by stairways.  The record attendance for an NFL regular season game was set in 2009 with a crowd of 105,121. It also has the world's 34th-largest high-definition video screen.

Construction and design

Originally estimated at $650 million, the stadium's actual construction cost rose to $1.15 billion, making it one of the most expensive sports venues ever built. To aid Cowboys owner and general manager, Jerry Jones, in paying the construction costs of the new stadium, Arlington voters approved the increase of the city's sales tax by 0.5%, the hotel occupancy tax by 2%, and car rental tax by 5%. The City of Arlington provided over $325 million (including interest) in bonds as funding, and Jones covered any cost overruns. Also, the NFL provided the Cowboys with an additional $150 million loan, following its policy for facilitating financing for the construction of new stadiums.

To prevent the Sun's glare from interfering with any players' eyesight, the vast majority of football fields are oriented north-south instead of east-west. However, AT&T Stadium was built with the field oriented east-west and with large windows on the western side. During afternoon games, this design allows sunlight to come into the stadium at an angle that can interfere with players' vision; some players have complained about this problem.

Lead architect on the design team at HKS Architects for the project was Bryan Trubey, who has stated that the overarching concept for the stadium was "...that this should not be just a stadium, but should almost be built like a civic structure."

A pair of nearly -tall arches spans the length of the stadium dome (one of the tallest domes in the world), anchored to the ground at each end. The new stadium also includes "more than 3,000 Sony LCD displays throughout the luxury suites, concourses, concession areas and more, offering fans viewing options that extend beyond the action on the field". It also houses a center-hung Mitsubishi video display board that was the largest HDTV screen in the world at the time of their installation. It has since been surpassed in size by the Panasonic "Big Hoss" video board (218 feet (66 m) wide and 94.6 feet (28.8 m) tall) at Texas Motor Speedway. Glass doors, allowing each end zone to be opened, were designed and constructed by Dallas-based Haley-Greer glass systems.

The retractable roof was designed by structural engineering firm Walter P Moore and the systems were implemented by mechanization consultants Uni-Systems. The electrification of Cowboys Stadium's retractable roof was developed by VAHLE, Inc.  These kinetic architecture fundamentals  are employed to create quick conversions of the facility to accommodate a variety of events. When the design was officially unveiled on December 12, 2006, it showed that from inside the stadium, the roof (membrane installed by K Post Company of Dallas) will look very similar to the Texas Stadium roof, with its trademark hole. However, it can be covered by the retractable roof panel to protect against the elements.

The football turf field was built by Hellas Construction, which developed a special SoftTop Convertible Turf system that has 26 interchangeable panels to allow the stadium to host a variety of events from concerts, dirt bike races, and monster truck rallies to college football, basketball, and soccer games.

A Dallas Cowboys Hall of Fame is planned for the Hall of Fame level. The drawings also include a site for a large sculpture northeast of the stadium, close to Randol Mill Road. Mayor Robert Cluck claimed to use eminent domain as a last resort, but most of the properties refused to sell to the city, indicating that the incentive program was not adequate according to Glenn Sodd, an attorney representing some homeowners in the area. Attorney Bob Cohen, who is representing some of the property owners, said the city gave many of his clients little incentive to sell. He said he represents the owners of some rental properties who were counting on that monthly revenue for their retirement and said most homeowners cannot afford to rebuild or buy in that area with the incentive package. An Arlington attorney was quoted as saying "The mayor sold out and the council went right along".

Timeline

1994: Cowboys owner Jerry Jones proposed to expand the 65,000-seat Texas Stadium by up to 40,000 seats, add retractable roof panels and install a climate-control system to make the stadium a year-round venue for sporting events, including the Super Bowl, concerts, and conventions.
1997–2000: The Cowboys held preliminary talks with Arlington officials about building a stadium there. The team also publicly discussed a $260 million plan to upgrade Texas Stadium. In 2000, the Cowboys compiled a list of potential stadium sites, which included Grapevine, Coppell, and Arlington. The team continued negotiating with Irving to renovate Texas Stadium.
2001: Jones said Arlington is a leading contender for a $500 million stadium. The primary site considered is the  Lakes of Arlington tract on Farm Road 157. Other cities in the running included Grapevine and Grand Prairie. In October, Jones discussed the new stadium with the mayors of Arlington, Irving, Grapevine, and Dallas.
2003: The Cowboys asked the Irving City Council to extend their lease at Texas Stadium, which was to expire at the end of the 2008 season, on a year-to-year basis. They narrowed their search to sites in Las Colinas and Dallas, and state legislators filed bills that would allow Dallas County to increase its hotel-occupancy and car-rental taxes to pay for a new stadium.
2004: In April, the Cowboys announced plans to build a $650 million stadium at Fair Park in Dallas. The deal required $425 million in public financing from a 3% hotel-occupancy tax and a 6% car-rental tax. The deal fell apart in June when Dallas County commissioners said they cannot justify asking voters to approve the team's request for $425 million in public funding. In July, the Cowboys and Arlington announced they are negotiating to locate the stadium near Globe Life Park (then Ameriquest Field). In August, the Arlington City Council agreed unanimously to put before voters a tax increase that would fund the city's $325 million portion of the project. Voters approved the tax increase on November 2.
2005: Arlington and the Cowboys chose the site south of Randol Mill Road and east of Collins Street for the new stadium. The city began notifying residents and property owners of its plans to acquire their property. The Cowboys hired the HKS architectural firm to design the stadium. Early blueprints showed 414 luxury suites and a two-panel retractable roof. The city completed its sale of $297.9 million in bonds to pay for its portion of the construction. Demolition of houses began November 1.
January 2006: The Cowboys hired Oklahoma-based Manhattan Construction as the general contractor for the stadium and the city completed its land purchases, although it still faced a number of lawsuits over land acquisition. Later that month, Tarrant County work crews began demolition of more than 150 Arlington residences and small-business structures to make room for the stadium.
March 2006: An alliance was announced between Manhattan Construction and two general contractors, Rayco Construction of Grand Prairie and 3i Construction of Dallas, to manage the stadium's construction.
April 2006: Excavation began by Mario Sinacola and Sons Excavating.
August 2006: Two construction cranes were raised on the site.
October 2006: The grass amphitheater on Randol Mill Road was leveled to make way for the extension of Baird Farm Road.
December 2006: The stadium's structure began to go up, and on December 12, Jerry Jones unveiled the in-depth plans and designs of the stadium to the public.
January 2007: A construction worker was injured in a  fall.
February 2007: Masonry work began.
March 2007: Heldenfels Enterprises was awarded the contract to manufacture and erect the precast/prestressed concrete structural components and placement of them began in April.
June 2007: Work on the retractable roof, designed by Uni-Systems, started.
July 2007: Exterior facade and enclosure work began.
October 2007: The first steel arch was completed.

February 2008: The second steel arch was completed.
June 2008: Jones commissioned the world's largest 1080p HDTV,  to hang above field.
June 2008: An electrician was electrocuted while working on the stadium. Two days before, three people were injured while assembling a crane.
2009: The stadium was scheduled for "substantial completion" in June. The artificial-turf field was brought into the stadium in July. The Cowboys played their first preseason home game on August 21 and their first regular-season home game on Sunday, September 20.
May 13, 2009: Jerry Jones announced the official name of the new venue as Cowboys Stadium.
June 6, 2009: The first event was held at the stadium, with country concert showcasing Lee Ann Womack, Blake Shelton, Reba McEntire, and George Strait.
February 6, 2011: The 2010 NFL Season Super Bowl was hosted at the Cowboys Stadium, which had the Green Bay Packers defeat the Pittsburgh Steelers in Super Bowl XLV.
 July 25, 2013: Jerry Jones announced that the official name of the venue was changed to AT&T Stadium as part of a naming rights deal.
April 5–7, 2014: The stadium was home for the Final Four of the 2014 NCAA Division I men's basketball tournament.
 January 12, 2015: The stadium served as host of the first championship game in the College Football Playoff era. Ohio State defeated Oregon, 42–20.
 April 19, 2015: The stadium served as host of the 50th Annual Academy of Country Music Awards hosted by Blake Shelton and Luke Bryan.
 April 3, 2016: The stadium served as the host of WWE's WrestleMania 32.
 September 26, 2016: The Stadium Club opened, which was the first public five-days-a-week restaurant and bar located within the AT&T Stadium.
 April 2–3, 2022: The stadium served as the host of WWE's WrestleMania 38.

Opening
May 27, 2009: The stadium was completed and opened to the public. Ribbon cutting ceremony includes Cowboys players (including Rayfield Wright, Troy Aikman, Emmitt Smith, Michael Irvin, Daryl Johnston, Preston Pearson, and Chad Hennings), North Texas mayors and various media personalities.
June 6, 2009: Country music star George Strait, along with Reba McEntire, headlined the first event in the new stadium. Opening acts included Blake Shelton and Lee Ann Womack.
July 19, 2009: The first sporting event is held in Cowboys Stadium. Costa Rica won in the Gold Cup Quarterfinal game versus Guadeloupe, with the first goal scored in stadium history during the 2nd minute by Celso Borges. That match was immediately followed by a sold out match between Mexico and Haiti, with 82,252 in attendance.
July 26, 2009: The final match of the 2009 World Football Challenge is held between Chelsea F.C. and Club America. The London club won the match 2–0 in front of 57,229. The event was the second sporting event held in the new stadium, but was notable as the first event held during a severe thunderstorm.
August 20, 2009: Jody Dean, a member of the Texas Radio Hall of Fame and KLUV-FM (98.7) talk show host, will be Cowboys Stadium's public address announcer. Dean replaces his longtime nemesis KTCK 1310 AM "The Ticket"'s George Dunham, the Hot Fry enthusiast and former voice of Texas Stadium.
August 21, 2009: The Cowboys played the Tennessee Titans in their first preseason home game and first American football game ever played at Cowboys Stadium. The game was nationally televised on FOX at 7 PM CDT. Dallas won the game 30–10, with one play from scrimmage blown dead when a ball punted by Titans' rookie punter A. J. Trapasso struck the main video screen after repeatedly striking it during pregame warmups.
 September 5, 2009: Brigham Young defeated Oklahoma 14–13 in the first "regular-season" game played in the new stadium. 
September 20, 2009: The Cowboys played their first NFL regular-season game in the new stadium, with former President and Texas resident George W. Bush handling the opening coin toss. The Cowboys lost to their long-time NFC East division rivals, the New York Giants, 33–31 with Eli Manning leading them on a last-second field goal by Lawrence Tynes. It was televised on NBC. This game attracted a record-breaking crowd of 105,121. After the game, Manning signed the wall of the visitor's locker room with the message, "First win in the New Stadium."
September 28, 2009: The Cowboys got their first home regular-season win. They beat the Carolina Panthers 21–7 with 90,588 in attendance. The game was televised on ESPN's Monday Night Football and marked a record 42nd win for the Cowboys on that show.

Naming
Although the stadium had yet to sell naming rights, many fans started referring to the project with various nicknames such as "Jerry World", the "Death Star", "The Palace in Dallas" (for which announcer Bob Costas was criticized by the Arlington mayor), "Cowboys Cathedral", "Jerrassic Park" and others. There was also a petition by some fans to have the stadium named after longtime Cowboys' coach Tom Landry.

On May 13, 2009, Jerry Jones announced the official name as Cowboys Stadium.

On July 25, 2013, Jerry Jones announced that the Dallas Cowboys had agreed to grant naming rights to AT&T. The name change from Cowboys Stadium to AT&T Stadium took effect immediately. The sponsorship deal was reported to be worth about $17–19 million per year. Facility Solutions Group installed the "AT&T Stadium" letters on the top of the stadium. The letters are made of lightweight components and aluminum and are insulated and heated to melt ice and snow.

This is AT&T's third major sports venue where it holds the naming rights. The others are AT&T Center in San Antonio, and Jones AT&T Stadium in Lubbock.

Video board

Guinness World Records was on hand at the September 28, 2009, game against the Carolina Panthers to award certificates to the chairman of Mitsubishi Electric and Dallas Cowboys owner Jerry Jones for the world's largest HD video display. For basketball events played in Cowboys Stadium, such as the 2010 NBA All-Star Game, the video board is actually larger than the court. It has since been surpassed in size by the screen at Charlotte Motor Speedway and the video boards at TIAA Bank Field.

The punt deflected backwards and was ruled in-play until Titans coach Jeff Fisher informed the officials that the punt struck the scoreboard. By rule, the down was replayed. Jerry Jones believes that Trapasso was trying to hit the scoreboard, saying, "If you look at how you punt the football, unless you're trying to hit the scoreboard, you punt the ball to get downfield. You certainly want to get some hangtime, but you punt the ball to get downfield, and you sure don't punt the ball down the middle. You punt it off to the side." Whether the screen would affect an opposing team's punting strategy has been debated. For teams with strategies centered on maximizing hang time, physicist Christopher Moore of Longwood University has shown via computer simulation that well-kicked punts have the potential to hit the screen no matter the field position. Trapasso disputed Jones' suggestion that he was intentionally trying to hit the board, and other NFL punters have suggested that the board may pose a problem for longer hang-time punts. The screen was retrofitted with 16 custom winches using  of  domestic galvanized wire rope to transport the video board in time to make room for U2's massive set during their 360° Tour, and was moved back down after the concert.

On August 24, 2013, during a preseason game against the Cincinnati Bengals, Cowboys punter Chris Jones became the second player to hit the scoreboard. He conceded a touchdown on the rekick.

On January 16, 2022, during the Cowboys' Wild Card playoff game against the San Francisco 49ers, Cowboys punter Bryan Anger became the third player to hit the video board with a kick in the third quarter, and the first to do so in the postseason. This prompted referee Alex Kemp to explain the necessitated rekick by rule to the crowd.

On September 11, 2022, Tampa Bay Buccaneers punter Jake Camarda hit the video board, becoming the fourth punter to do so.

Major events

NBA All-Star Weekend
On February 14, 2010, the stadium hosted the 2010 NBA All-Star Game. With an announced crowd of 108,713, the game became the highest-attended basketball game in history, setting a new Guinness World Record. The East squad prevailed with a 141–139 victory over the West.

NFL

On January 3, 2010, the Cowboys defeated the Philadelphia Eagles in a 24–0 shutout to win the NFC East division title and complete the first ever back-to-back shutouts in franchise history.
On January 9, 2010, the Cowboys hosted their first playoff game in the new stadium, again playing the Eagles. Dallas won 34–14, breaking their infamous 13-year playoff win drought.
On February 6, 2011, the stadium hosted Super Bowl XLV in which the Green Bay Packers defeated the Pittsburgh Steelers, 31–25. Others bidding for the game's location were the University of Phoenix Stadium in Glendale, Arizona and Lucas Oil Stadium in Indianapolis, Indiana. The Cowboys attempted to increase its capacity to 105,000 seats in hopes of setting the record for attendance at a Super Bowl. In a last-minute rush to add seats during one of the area's notorious ice storms, 7 construction workers were injured by ice sliding off of the stadium roof. Hours before kickoff, over 1,200 seats were blocked off in the interest of safety; according to a police officer in the affected area, the seats hadn't been finished in time for the fire marshal to inspect them. Approximately 800 people were given other seats inside the stadium, thus costing the NFL any chance of setting the Super Bowl attendance record (the final figure of 103,219 came 766 short of the record set in Super Bowl XIV). However, about 400 people were unable to be seated and were given a letter from the NFL that could be exchanged for three times the face value of the ticket. Those people were also given the option to either watch on a TV in one of the stadium's lounges, where they would be unable to see the field in person, or watch on screens outside the stadium. The NFL also announced that those 400 people would receive free tickets to the next year's Super Bowl. On February 9, 2011, the first lawsuit was filed against the NFL and Jerry Jones. In 2018, the stadium hosted the 2018 NFL Draft.

College football

College Football Playoff National Championship

January 12, 2015: The (4) Ohio State Buckeyes defeated the (2) Oregon Ducks 42–20, before a crowd of 85,689 in the inaugural 2015 College Football Playoff National Championship.

Big 12 Championship Game

AT&T Stadium was the site of the 2009 and 2010 Big 12 Championship Games, the last two held prior to the 2010–13 Big 12 Conference realignment. On December 5, 2009, the Texas Longhorns defeated the Nebraska Cornhuskers 13–12 in the 2009 Big 12 Championship Game, the first to be held in the stadium with attendance announced at 76,211. The following year, on December 4, 2010,  the Oklahoma Sooners and Nebraska Cornhuskers rekindled their rivalry as the Sooners won 23–20 in the final Big 12 Championship game until the 2017 season. The stadium was scheduled to host the games through the 2013 season, but the realignment of the Big 12 Conference to 10 teams meant they were not allowed to host a championship game because of NCAA rules requiring conferences to have at least 12 teams divided into two divisions in order to stage a championship game. However, the NCAA would later change its rules and allow a conference championship game regardless of the number of members of said conference.

Cotton Bowl Classic

January 2, 2010: In the first bowl game played at the stadium, the Ole Miss Rebels defeated the Oklahoma State Cowboys, 21–7 in the 74th installment of the AT&T Cotton Bowl Classic. Attendance was 77,928 and was the third largest attendance of any preceding Cotton Bowl game. With Oklahoma State having played in the Cotton Bowl, all Big 12 South Teams have played at least one game in the Cowboys Stadium.
January 7, 2011: In the 75th installment of the AT&T Cotton Bowl Classic, the LSU Tigers by a score of 41–24 defeated the Texas A&M Aggies with an outstanding attendance of 83,514 making it the second largest attendance in Cotton Bowl history. LSU finished with an 11–2 record and Texas A&M finished 9–4 making it their 49th meeting all time.
January 6, 2012: The Arkansas Razorbacks defeated Kansas State Wildcats, 29–16. Attendance was 80,956, currently the third-highest attendance in Cotton Bowl history. During the game, Arkansas receiver Joe Adams returned a punt 51 yards for a touchdown, which was the first punt return for a touchdown in the Cotton Bowl since former Arkansas Razorback Lance Alworth returned a punt 49 yards for a touchdown in a 7–6 loss to Duke in 1961. The win also propelled the Razorbacks to a #5 ranking in the final AP poll and gave them their first 11-win season since joining the Southeastern Conference in 1991. Kansas State ended the season with a 10–3 record and ranked #15 in the final AP poll.
January 4, 2013: The (10) Texas A&M Aggies defeated the (12) Oklahoma Sooners 41–13 to finish the season with an 11–2 record. Johnny Manziel rushed for 229 yards (on just 17 carries) during the game, a Cotton Bowl record and national bowl record for a quarterback, rushing for two touchdowns and throwing for two more. Manziel totaled 516 total yards also a Cotton Bowl Classic record. Though the halftime score was 14–13 Texas A&M, the Aggies went on to score 27 unanswered second half points to win the game. The game's attendance of 87,025 is the second highest in Cotton Bowl Classic history, behind the 2009 game between Mississippi-Texas Tech at 88,175.
January 3, 2014: The (9) Missouri Tigers defeated the (13) Oklahoma State Cowboys 41–31 in front of an attendance of 72,690.
January 1, 2015: The (7) Michigan State Spartans rallied from a 20-point deficit to defeat the (4) Baylor Bears 42–41 in front of an attendance of 71,464. This was the first Cotton Bowl Classic game to be featured as one of the "New Year's Six" bowls of the College Football Playoff.
January 2, 2017: The (8) Wisconsin Badgers defeated the (15) Western Michigan Broncos in front of 59,615.
December 29, 2017: The (5) Ohio State Buckeyes defeated the (8) USC Trojans by a score of 24–7 in front of 67,510.
December 29, 2018: The (2) Clemson Tigers defeated the (3) Notre Dame Fighting Irish 30–3 in front of 72,183.

Rose Bowl 

 January 1, 2021: The (1) Alabama Crimson Tide defeated the (4) Notre Dame Fighting Irish 31–14 in front of 18,373. This game was the first since 1942 that the Rose Bowl was not played in Pasadena, California; prompted by restrictions due to the COVID-19 pandemic.

Advocare Classic

September 5, 2009: The (20) Brigham Young University Cougars and (3) Oklahoma Sooners played the first college football game in the new stadium, with the Cougars upsetting the Sooners, 14–13, in front of 75,437 spectators. So BYU holds the distinction of being the first college team to win a game in the stadium, and the team to win the first (non-preseason) game in the stadium.
September 4, 2010: (6) TCU defeated (24) Oregon State 30–21, before a crowd of 46,138, in a season-opening encounter between ranked teams.
September 3, 2011: (4) LSU defeated (3) Oregon 40–27, before a crowd of 87,711 in the third installment of the Cowboys Classic.
September 1, 2012: Defending 2011 champion (2) Alabama defeated (8) Michigan 41–14, before a crowd of 90,413 in the fourth installment of the Cowboys Classic.
 August 31, 2013: (12) LSU defeated (20) TCU 37–27, before a crowd of 80,230 in the fifth installment of the Cowboys Classic.
 August 30, 2014: Defending 2013 champion (1) Florida State defeated unranked Oklahoma State 37–31, before a crowd of 61,521 in the sixth installment of the Cowboys Classic.
 August 31, 2019: (16) Auburn defeated the Oregon Ducks 27-21, after rallying from a 15 point deflict in the 3rd quarter, and scoring the winning touchdown with 9 seconds left.

Southwest Classic

The Arkansas Razorbacks vs. Texas A&M Aggies football rivalry, which began in 1903, was renewed in 2009 as the Southwest Classic, and was played at Cowboys Stadium from 2009 through 2011. In 2012, Texas A&M joined Arkansas in the Southeastern Conference, and the series reverted to the schools' home fields, Kyle Field in College Station, Texas for the 2012 game and Donald W. Reynolds Razorback Stadium in Fayetteville, Arkansas in 2013. The Southwest Classic returned to AT&T Stadium in 2014 and will remain there through at least 2024.

The 2020 game was moved from Arlington to College Station due to the ongoing COVID-19 pandemic.

October 3, 2009: Cowboys owner Jerry Jones watched his alma mater, the Arkansas Razorbacks, defeat the Texas A&M Aggies 47–19 in the first of ten games called the Southwest Classic to be played at the stadium.
October 9, 2010: The Arkansas Razorbacks jumped out to an early 21–7 lead, and held on to defeat the Texas A&M Aggies, 24–17.
October 1, 2011: The Arkansas Razorbacks rallied from an 18-point halftime deficit to defeat the Texas A&M Aggies 41–38.
September 27, 2014: The Texas A&M Aggies rallied from a deficit to force overtime and then scored the only TD for the 35–28 win to defeat the Arkansas Razorbacks.
September 26, 2015: Texas A&M rallied from a fourth quarter deficit for the second straight year versus Arkansas, beating the Razorbacks 28–21 in OT.
September 24, 2016: After being tied at halftime, the Aggies dominated the second half to defeat the Razorbacks 45–24.
September 25, 2021: Arkansas snaps 9-game losing streak against the Aggies, defeating Texas A&M 20–10 and going 4-0 for the first time since 2003.

Texas Farm Bureau Insurance Shootout

In 2009, the Big 12 Conference game between the Baylor Bears and Texas Tech Red Raiders was held at Cowboys Stadium, the first time in the series the match-up was held on a neutral site. The game was the highest attended in the series' history, with 71,964 in attendance.

After the 2010 game was held at the Cotton Bowl in Fair Park, Dallas during the State Fair of Texas, the series returned to AT&T Stadium for the 2011 and 2012 games. The series' neutral site contract at AT&T Stadium could continue until 2014.

Basketball

December 19, 2009: In the first college basketball game at the stadium, before a crowd of 38,052, the Texas Longhorns defeated the defending national champion North Carolina Tar Heels, 103–90.
March 2013: 2013 NCAA Tournament South Regional featuring 3 games with the winner of the third going to the NCAA men's Final Four
2014: 2014 NCAA men's Final Four
2030: NCAA Men's Final Four

Soccer
July 19, 2009 – Cowboys Stadium hosted two matches in the quarterfinal round of the 2009 CONCACAF Gold Cup. Costa Rica defeated Guadeloupe, 5–1. Mexico shut out Haiti, 4–0 in front of 85,000 fans.
July 17, 2010 – On July 17, 2010, two of the top professional soccer clubs in Mexico – Club America and San Luis F.C. – met in a friendly at Cowboys Stadium. Club America made its second appearance at Cowboys Stadium. In 2009, Club America played Chelsea FC in the World Football Challenge in front of 57,229 fans at Cowboys Stadium.
June 5, 2011 – Cowboys Stadium hosted the opening matches of the 2011 CONCACAF Gold Cup. Costa Rica defeated Cuba 5–0 in the opener, while Mexico defeated El Salvador 5–0 in the nightcap in front of 80,108 fans.
August 6, 2011 – 2011 World Football Challenge; Club America vs FC Barcelona; score 2–0 in front of 60,087 fans.
June 3, 2012 – Cowboys Stadium hosted a soccer match in which Mexico played against 5-time world cup champions Brazil. Mexico defeated Brazil 2–0 with goals from Giovani dos Santos and Javier Hernández.
July 24, 2013 – Cowboys Stadium hosted the semifinals matches of the 2013 CONCACAF Gold Cup. United States defeated Honduras 3–1 and Panama defeated Mexico 2–1. It was the last event at the venue using the name Cowboys Stadium, and was the first appearance of the U.S. soccer team at this stadium.
July 22, 2017 – 2017 CONCACAF Gold Cup semi-final. United States defeated Costa Rica 2–0.
July 31, 2018 – 2018 International Champions Cup; AS Roma defeated FC Barcelona 4–2
July 10, 2021 – 2021 CONCACAF Gold Cup group stage. Mexico draws with Trinidad and Tobago 0–0. 
July 25, 2021 – 2021 CONCACAF Gold Cup quarter-final. United States defeated Jamaica 1–0.

2026 FIFA World Cup
AT&T Stadium will host multiple matches during the 2026 FIFA World Cup, which will be organized and hosted across the United States, Canada and Mexico. In September 2022, it was reported that the stadium might be hosting the final. The stadium will undergo renovations in the years prior to the start of the tournament. The stadium will also be temporarily renamed to "Dallas Stadium" in accordance with FIFA's policy on corporate sponsored names.

Boxing
The stadium has hosted multiple world championship boxing fights since its opening, as the large capacity and retractable roof make it an ideal venue for boxing events throughout the year. Many of the sport's biggest stars including Manny Pacquiao and Canelo Álvarez have headlined championship bouts there.

March 13, 2010 - The Event: Before a crowd of 50,994, Manny Pacquiao recorded a unanimous decision over Joshua Clottey to retain his WBO welterweight title.
 November 13, 2010 – The Eighth Wonder of the World: In front of 41,734 fans, Manny Pacquiao defeated Antonio Margarito to win the WBC super welterweight title. In doing so, he made history in becoming the first fighter to win world titles in 8 different weight classes.
 September 17, 2016 – Before a crowd of 51,420, Canelo Álvarez defeated Liam Smith by knockout in round nine to win the WBO light middleweight title. The event broke the then-AT&T Stadium attendance record for boxing.
March 16, 2019 - Before a crowd of 47,525, Errol Spence Jr. defended his IBF welterweight title in his 12-round shutout of undefeated four-division world champion Mikey Garcia on Fox Sports PPV.
December 5, 2020 - In front of 16,978 fans due to covid restrictions, Errol Spence Jr. defeated Danny García by unanimous decision in 12 rounds. 
May 8, 2021 - Face The Fearless: In front of a crowd of 73,126 which broke the all-time attendance record for a boxing event at an indoor venue in the United States, Canelo Álvarez unified the WBA (Super), WBC and WBO super-middleweight titles when he beat undefeated two-division world champion Billy Joe Saunders by eighth-round corner retirement.
April 15, 2022 - In front of a crowd of 40,828 Errol Spence Jr unified the WBA (Super), WBC and IBF welterweight titles when he beat Yordenis Ugas by tenth round knockout.

WrestleMania
AT&T Stadium hosted WWE's WrestleMania 32 on April 3, 2016. It was the third WrestleMania to be hosted in Texas. The area also hosted activities throughout the region for the week-long celebration leading up to WrestleMania itself. 101,763 people attended the event breaking the previous WrestleMania attendance record set at WrestleMania III.

On April 2 and 3, 2022, the stadium hosted WrestleMania 38.

Supercross
AT&T Stadium has hosted a round of the AMA Supercross Championship since 2010, replacing Texas Stadium which had been host since 1975.

Concerts

Other events
 September 5, 2009 – Led by a strong defensive effort and quarterback Max Hall's 329 yards passing, No. 20 BYU defeated No. 3 Oklahoma 14–13 in the first college game played in the new Dallas Cowboys Stadium in Arlington, Texas. 
 September 7, 2009 – The first high school football game played at Cowboys Stadium was between Euless Trinity and Bingham (Utah). Trinity won, 42–21.
 November 12, 2009 – The first Texas high school football playoff game played at Cowboys Stadium was between Bowie High School (Arlington, Texas) and Richland High School (North Richland Hills; Texas).
 February 2010 – The Professional Bull Riders hosted the Dickies Iron Cowboy Invitational in February 2010.
 February 2010 – The first MDA Muscle Walk in the Dallas-Fort Worth area took place. This event was held annually, having returned in 2011, 2012, and 2013. That event has since moved to Globe Life Park in Arlington (formerly Rangers Ballpark) starting in 2014.

 February 27, 2010 – The stadium hosted its first Monster Jam event with 11 trucks. This event is now held annually, having returned in 2011 and scheduled for 2012.
 June 30, 2011 – The final round of the 2011 US Women's Open in bowling was played at Cowboys Stadium, with Leanne Hulsenberg winning.
 Dec. 7 – 17, 2011 – Cowboys Stadium hosted all the Texas 11-man football state championships for the first time. It was also the first time all 11-man state championships were held in one location.
 February 2011 – The Professional Bull Riders hosted the Dickies Iron Cowboy Invitational in February 2011.
 February 2012 – The Professional Bull Riders hosted the Dickies Iron Cowboy Invitational in February 2012.
 February 2013 – The Professional Bull Riders hosted the Dickies Iron Cowboy Invitational in February 2013.
 February 11, 2013 – American Sniper Chris Kyle's memorial ceremony proceeded by a  procession across Texas.
 February 2013 – The Professional Bull Riders hosted the Dickies Iron Cowboy Invitational in February 2014.
 February 2014 – The inaugural The American Rodeo was held.
 April 26, 2014 – AT&T Stadium hosted the senior prom of South Garland High School.
 June 27–29, 2014 – International Assembly of Jehovah's Witnesses
 July 6, 2014 – Semi-pro football (EFL) held its first indoor Pro Bowl game.
 July 25–27, 2014 – International Assembly of Jehovah's Witnesses
 February 2015 – The Professional Bull Riders hosted the Choctaw Casino Resort Iron Cowboy in February 2015.
 February 2015 – The American Rodeo was held.
 March 7, 2015 – The 2015 AT&T American Cup, an FIG World Cup event, is held at the stadium.
 June 20, 2015 – AT&T Stadium hosted thousands of Spartans for Reebok's Spartan Race.
 January 12, 2016 – The world premiere of 13 Hours: The Secret Soldiers of Benghazi was attended by over 30,000 people and shown on the giant high-definition screen.
 February 2016 – The Professional Bull Riders hosted the Choctaw Casino Resort Iron Cowboy in February 2016.
 February 2016 – The American Rodeo was held.
 March 6, 2016 – Greg Laurie's Harvest America took place at the stadium. It is considered the largest evangelical event ever. Special guests included Chris Tomlin, Lecrae, MercyMe, and Switchfoot.
 April 3, 2016 – WrestleMania 32, the premier event of the professional wrestling organization WWE, was held.
 February 2017 – The Professional Bull Riders hosted the Choctaw Casino Resort Iron Cowboy in February 2017.
 February 2017 – The American Rodeo was held.
 February 2018 – The Professional Bull Riders hosted the WinStar World Casino and Resort Iron Cowboy in 2018.
 February 2018 – The American Rodeo was held.
 February 2019 – The third PBR Global Cup took place at AT&T Stadium.
 February 2020 – The fourth PBR Global Cup was held.
 November 2020 – The annual PBR World Finals took place at AT&T Stadium after being moved from Las Vegas due to Nevada state restrictions stemming from the COVID-19 pandemic.
 April 2–3, 2022 – WrestleMania 38 was held.

Concessions and merchandising
On October 20, 2008, Cowboys owner Jones and New York Yankees owner George Steinbrenner announced a joint business venture called Legends Hospitality Management LLC which would operate the concessions and merchandising sales at the new Cowboys stadium in Arlington, Texas, and at the new Yankee Stadium in the Bronx, New York, along with the stadiums of the Yankees' minor league affiliates. Former Pizza Hut President Michael Rawlings will run the company from its new headquarters in Newark, New Jersey. The company was also backed by Wall Street investment firm Goldman Sachs and Dallas private equity firm CIC Partners LP.

Art collection 
The Jones family commissioned 18 contemporary artists to create site-specific artworks for the stadium. The stadium features paintings, sculptures, and installations by Franz Ackermann, Doug Aitken, Ricci Albenda, Mel Bochner, Daniel Buren, Olafur Eliasson, Teresita Fernandez, Wayne Gonzales, Terry Haggerty, Trenton Doyle Hancock, Jacqueline Humphries, Jim Isermann, Annette Lawrence, Dave Muller, Gary Simmons, and Lawrence Weiner.

In 2013, the stadium acquired Sky Mirror, a sculpture by Anish Kapoor. It sits in a plaza outside the east end of the stadium.

Transportation

Parking

The fees for premium parking at Dallas Cowboys games are estimated at $75 per game, based on season ticket holder parking charges. The fees to park at major concerts and other sporting events will be nearly $40 per space at the new stadium. A shuttle operates between the T&P Station and AT&T Stadium for all Cowboys regular season and postseason games and selected college football games, which averages approximately 900 riders per game.  For special events like Super Bowl XLV parking prices can increase to as much as $990.

Public transit
The stadium was only accessible via the Metro Arlington Xpress (MAX) bus system; a  walk from the Collins and Andrews stop which connected with the Trinity Rail Express (TRE) station at CentrePort/DFW Airport. The bus system was an experimental program which commenced in April 2013 and was replaced by a ride-sharing service in December 2017.

See also
History of the Dallas Cowboys
Globe Life Field
List of tallest domes

References

External links

 

2009 establishments in Texas
21st century in Arlington, Texas
American football venues in the Dallas–Fort Worth metroplex
AT&T
Big 12 Championship Game venues
Boxing venues in the United States
CONCACAF Gold Cup stadiums
2026 FIFA World Cup Stadiums
Cotton Bowl Classic
Dallas Cowboys stadiums
Music venues in the United States
National Football League venues
NCAA bowl game venues
NCAA Division I men's basketball tournament Final Four venues
Retractable-roof stadiums in the United States
Rodeo venues in the United States
Sports venues completed in 2009
Sports venues in Arlington, Texas
Soccer venues in Texas
Wrestling venues in the Dallas–Fort Worth metroplex